Robert Lee Jackson (born August 7, 1954), nicknamed "Stonewall", is a former National Football League (NFL) linebacker. He starred for Texas A&M University, then played in the NFL for the Cleveland Browns and the Atlanta Falcons between 1977 and 1982.

Football career
Jackson attended Texas A&M University and was a consensus College Football All-America Team linebacker and a Lombardi Award finalist for the Aggies in 1976. He was a first-round selection of the Cleveland Browns in the 1977 NFL Draft.

Jackson missed his entire rookie season after a preseason knee injury. He suffered another knee injury in the 1978 preseason, but he still appeared in 14 games that season. He was a regular starter for Cleveland in 1980 and 1981, starting 14 games in each season. In 1981, Cincinnati head coach Forrest Gregg referred to Jackson as the dirtiest player in the NFL.

In April 1982, Jackson was traded to the Denver Broncos, but he was waived before the regular season. He was signed by the Atlanta Falcons that September. Jackson's career concluded that year with five appearances for the Falcons.

References

1954 births
Living people
Players of American football from Houston
All-American college football players
American football linebackers
Texas A&M Aggies football players
Cleveland Browns players
Atlanta Falcons players